Streptothricin hydrolase (sttH (gene)) is an enzyme with systematic name streptothricin-F hydrolase. This enzyme catalyses the following chemical reaction

 streptothricin-F + H2O  streptothricin-F acid

The enzyme also catalyses the hydrolysis of streptothricin-D to streptothricin-D acid.

References

External links 
 

EC 3.5.2